Hälsingfors may refer to:

 Hälsingfors, a village in Västerbotten County, Sweden
 An obsolete spelling of Helsingfors, the Swedish name for Helsinki, Finland